David McCord Wright (1909–1968) was an American economist and educator at the University of Georgia. He was a graduate of Harvard University.

Personal
Wright was born in Savannah, Georgia. He married Caroline Noble Jones and had three children: Anna, Antony and Peter.

Professional

Teaching

Wright was an economics professor at the University of Virginia; he also served as an advisor to the U.S. Federal government. Wright took a professorship at the University of Georgia’s Terry College of Business from 1962 until his death in 1968. The Economics Department sponsors the annual David McCord Wright Lecture.

Some of Wright’s students are former U.S. Senator Phil Gramm, Ronald Reagan's Budget Director Jim Miller and the former Dallas Federal Reserve chief Bob McTeer. McTeer recalls his teacher repeating the lesson, “Growth comes through change and causes change.”  McTeer's 2000 Wright Lecture memorialized both Wright’s teachings and life.

Books

Wright published many articles and books during his life. Some of them are The Keynesian System,, which was part four of The Miller Lectures, The Trouble with Marx in 1967 and Democracy and Progress in 1948. In The Trouble With Marx, Dr. Wright  foretold the decline and fall of the Soviet system. His critical analysis explained  how the inherent rigidity of central planning and command economies of Marxist–Leninist regimes  inhibit economic growth by suppressing the essential quality needed for growth: change  which fosters further growth. The Trouble with Marx was also used  his Comparative Economic Systems course which he taught in summer sessions  at the Naval War College at Newport, Rhode Island.

References

1909 births
1968 deaths
Harvard University alumni
University of Georgia faculty
American economics writers
People from Savannah, Georgia
20th-century American economists
20th-century American non-fiction writers
20th-century American male writers
American male non-fiction writers